Jan Wężyk (1575–1638), of Wąż Coat of Arms, was a Polish noble and Roman Catholic bishop and Primate of Poland.

Biography
Jan Wężyk was born in Wola Wężykowa, Poland  in 1575. In 1619, he was selected by the King of Poland as Bishop of Przemyśl and confirmed by Pope Paul V on 17 Feb 1620. Later in 1620, he was consecrated bishop by Wawrzyniec Gembicki, Archbishop of Gniezno. On 13 May 1624, he was appointed during the papacy of Pope Urban VIII as Bishop of Poznań and installed on 1 Jul 1624. In 1626, he was selected by the King of Poland as Archbishop of Gniezno and Primate of Poland and confirmed by Pope Urban VIII on 22 Mar 1627.

He served as interrex (for 9 months) after the death of king Sigismund III Vasa in 1632, before the royal election of Władysław IV Waza. As the interrerx he supported improving the procedures of the royal elections. He was a political ally of Polish queen consort Constance of Austria, and took part in reform of church law in Poland. He authored Synodus provincialis Gnesnensis A.D. 1628 die 22 mai celebrata (1629), Synodus provincialis Gnesensis (1634), and Constitutiones Synodorum Metropolitanae Ecclesiae Gnesnensis Provincialium (1630).

He served as Archbishop of Gniezno and Primate of Poland until his death on 27 May 1638.

Episcopal succession

References

External links
 Catholic-hierarchy.org entry
List of Primates of Poland 

1575 births
1638 deaths
Bishops of Przemyśl
Bishops of Poznań
Archbishops of Gniezno
Canons of Kraków
17th-century Roman Catholic archbishops in the Polish–Lithuanian Commonwealth
Polish interreges
Bishops appointed by Pope Paul V
Bishops appointed by Pope Urban VIII